Sophie Carle (born 7 June 1964 in Luxembourg City) is a Luxembourgish actress and singer mostly operating in France. She has appeared in several films, and represented Luxembourg in the 1984 Eurovision Song Contest with the song "100% d'amour". She was only the fourth native Luxembourgian to represent the country, after Camillo Felgen (1960 and 1962), Chris Baldo (1968) and Monique Melsen (1971).

Filmography 
 Plus beau que moi tu meurs (1982)
 Souvenirs souvenirs (1984), as Muriel
 À nous les garçons (1984), as Véronique
 Requiem pour un fumeur (1985)
 Bing (1986, TV)
 L'Or noir de Lornac (1987, TV series), as Odette
 Napoleon and Josephine: A Love Story (1987, TV miniseries), as Claudine
 Diventerò padre (1988, TV)
  (1989), as Silke
 Câlins d'abord (1989, TV series), as Malou
  (1990, TV series, 1 episode), as Mlle Bondon
 Triplex (1991), as Brigitte
 Les Années campagne (1992), as Evelyne
 Un commissario a Roma (1993, TV series)
 Placé en garde à vue (1994, TV series)
 Coup de vice (1996), as Natacha
 Peur blanche (1998, TV), as Nicole
 Cavalcade (2005)

Discography 

 "100% d'amour" (1984)

References

External links and sources 
 
 A.Bernardini, Nino Manfredi "Un commissario a Roma" page 222

1964 births
Living people
20th-century Luxembourgian women singers
Eurovision Song Contest entrants for Luxembourg
Eurovision Song Contest entrants of 1984
French actresses